Estudio Haini is an animation studio located in Guadalajara, Mexico, known for the production of CuriosaMente, a YouTube channel for the popularization of knowledge. They are recognized for its short films El relato de Sam Brennan (Sam Brennan's tale) and El funeral de Don Jején (Mr. Sandfly's wake).

The studio was founded in 2003 by Tonatiuh Moreno and Ruy Fernando Estrada when, after completing the pilot episode "Tortas y lagartos" from the series The City of Others, they decided to continue to produce animation, such as There is No Substitute the video that won the A Day Without Water organized by Canal Once (Mexico) in 2004. They won the local contests ConComics and Julio Verne in the comics category and won the design competition for the logo of the Museum of Paleontology of Guadalajara.

The studio is currently working in the pre-production of their first complete feature film, Fausto el Mago Extremo, and are co-producers of the videogame Chaneques

Relevant films

References

External links
 
  

Mexican animation studios
Film production companies of Mexico
Mass media in Guadalajara